Gujarat Metro Rail Corporation Limited (GMRC) is joint venture company between the Government of India and Government of Gujarat, and is headquartered in Gandhinagar, Gujarat, India.

Systems

Operational Systems

Systems in development

References 

 
Rapid transit companies of India
Railway companies established in 2010
Indian companies established in 2010
2010 establishments in Gujarat